Korvus is a fictional character appearing in American comic books published by Marvel Comics. Korvus wields a weapon known as the Blade of the Phoenix and made his first appearance in The Uncanny X-Men #478 on September 6, 2006.

Fictional character biography
Though the Shi'ar have denied it for centuries, one of their race once wielded the power of the Phoenix. Rook'shir wielded the universal power through a giant blade, called the Blade of the Phoenix, and devastated much of the Shi'ar Empire until the Imperial Guard was formed to defeat him. However, a fraction of his power remained in the blade, which could only be lifted by a direct descendant of Rook'shir. Hoping that the blade would never be lifted again, the Shi'ar focused on wiping out Rook'shir's descendants.

The descendants were killed by the Vice-Chancellor K'tor, a loyalist of D'Ken, who kept only one survivor as a slave. The survivor was Korvus, and he was tortured as he worked on mechanical constructs, and when he reached adulthood, Korvus was imprisoned in the high security prison on the moon of Phygim and a device was placed on his brain that could be triggered if he tried to escape.

During "The Rise and Fall of the Shi'ar Empire", K'tor approached Korvus in prison and offered to commute the rest of Korvus' sentence if he acted against Marvel Girl, who was, along with Havok, Polaris, Professor X, Nightcrawler, Darwin and Warpath, coming to the Shi'ar Empire to stop Vulcan on his quest for vengeance.

K'tor allowed Korvus to take the Blade of the Phoenix and gave him a ship so he could slay Rachel. Korvus eventually found the band of X-Men by tracking Marvel Girl's Phoenix's brand, to which he was drawn. Korvus landed on their ship and easily thwarted the combined X-Men with the Blade. However, when he tried to slay Rachel, she grasped the Blade and their minds were involuntarily linked, reliving each other's lives in essence and forming a close bond between them. He then chose to ally with the X-Men and the device on his brain was deactivated with the help of Rachel.

Korvus taught the X-Men that their jumpship had the potential of opening a stargate using their own mutant power sources. Korvus worked on fixing the ship while the X-Men sent out a distress signal to the Starjammers. Korvus and Marvel Girl continued experiencing their mental bond, drawn together, and began a romantic involvement. She soon puts an end to the relationship, believing their connection isn't real and is due to the time their minds bonded because of the residual Phoenix force. This was much to Korvus' dismay, who actually began to fall in love with her.

After the death of Corsair at the hands of Vulcan, he, along with Havok, Polaris, Rachel, Ch'od and Raza become the new Starjammers, electing to remain in Shi'ar space and restore Lilandra to the throne.

Kingbreaker

During a battle with Vulcan's new guard, the Phoenix fragment in his sword, and within Rachel leaves them both.

War of Kings

Marvel has announced that Korvus and the Starjammers will play a large role in the upcoming War of Kings storyline, which also features Vulcan, The Inhumans, Nova, and The Guardians of the Galaxy.

Realm of Kings
It is known through Ch'od that Korvus, along with Rachel, Polaris and Havok, have departed for Earth, apparently to report the incident where Korvus and Rachel lost the connection to the Phoenix Force.

Rescue Mission
The quartet never made it, though, as they stopped by a Shi'ar space station on the way. Unfortunately, the station came under attack by an alien named Friendless, one of the telepathic alien workers on board, and he triggered a civil war amongst the races that lived on the station. In the chaos, Korvus was mind controlled by Friendless and the ship's gravity generators were damaged. As the war waged on, the station began to be pulled into the star it was orbiting. Rachel managed to get a message to Earth and help arrived in the form of Rogue and some X-Men. With Rogue's help, Rachel managed to block Friendless's mind control, freeing Korvus. Whilst Rachel confronted Friendless mind-to-mind, Korvus could only help by watching her limp body and doing his best to protect it. Friendless was eventually beaten and the space station was teleported across the universe into Earth's orbit. Whilst most of the heroes were glad to be home, Korvus could only think that he was even further away from his.

Stranded on Earth
When Korvus and the group returned to the X-Men, a new situation began to emerge. Rogue could feel that more people had returned to Earth than they knew and, when Dr. Nemesis conducted his tests, he found that Korvus held the key. Each of the eight heroes who had been on the station now possessed a small quantity of unknown energy, but Korvus' sword had a much higher concentration of it. The sword had become a doorway and someone was on the other side.

Rogue figured out it was a lost ally that she thought had died. Whilst Rogue set off on a rescue mission, Korvus was left to get acquainted with the X-Men's home of Utopia. He was not impressed by Cyclops or the fact the X-Men were being forced to live on a small island. Korvus was at a loss as to what to do now he was on Earth but thankfully an opportunity dropped in his lap. The space station that was teleported to Earth also contained a Shi'ar salvage crew that were just happening to be looking for a captain. Korvus left Earth to be in space where he was much more at home.

Back with the Starjammers
The distance between Rachel and Korvus didn't help their relationship and they drifted apart. The captain role didn't last long either, so he decided to leave everything behind and find the remaining Starjammers. He wasn't the only one to rejoin the team as Corsair, the team's dead leader, was resurrected and resumed his duty as captain of the space pirates. When the younger version of Jean Grey was put on trial for the crime of one day becoming host for the Phoenix Force, Korvus and the Starjammers intervened.

After his brief dalliance with Earth, Korvus remained with the Starjammers to travel the universe in search of adventure and glory. He found a suitable role amongst them as the mechanic for the starship and was even left in charge when Corsair was away. Unfortunately, when Corsair was off traveling with his son, the Starjammers were attacked by a rival gang of pirates and Korvus was cast out into space to die alongside his fellow crew. He was saved from certain death by a passing ship but the crew recognized the pirates and Korvus was arrested. He was due to be auctioned off as a slave but was saved by Corsair, who had stolen his ship back. Korvus is once again on the Starjammer, serving as its mechanic/muscle.

Powers and abilities
Korvus possesses all the typical attributes associated with the avian Shi'ar race of superhuman strength (typically able to lift 1 ton in Earth's gravity), enhanced speed, reflexes, agility, flexibility, coordination, balance, and endurance.

As wielder of the Phoenix Blade, Korvus is able to fly and fire energy blasts through the sword.

It is currently unknown if the Blade of the Phoenix further augments his natural abilities as a Shi'ar, although it is highly probable: Korvus survived two  direct hits from Gladiator and was seen back in action only a short time later.

During X-Men: Kingbreaker, the Phoenix leaves the sword making it powerless.

Korvus is well versed in Shi'ar technology, especially in Shi'ar Hyper Drives.

References

External links
Korvus at the Appendix to the Handbook of the Marvel Universe

 

Characters created by Ed Brubaker
Comics characters introduced in 2006
Fictional slaves
Fictional swordfighters in comics
Marvel Comics aliens
Marvel Comics characters who can move at superhuman speeds
Marvel Comics characters with superhuman strength
Marvel Comics extraterrestrial superheroes
Shi'ar